Çimenli is a village in the central district of Hakkâri Province in Turkey. The village is populated by Kurds of the Pinyanişî tribe and had a population of 322 in 2022.

History 
The village was populated by 6 Assyrian families in 1850, while no families were recorded in 1877.

Population 
Population history from 2000 to 2022:

References 

Villages in Hakkâri District
Kurdish settlements in Hakkâri Province
Historic Assyrian communities in Turkey